Jonas Jeberg (born January 28, 1975), is a Danish songwriter and music producer residing in Los Angeles. He has written and produced hit songs including Panic! at the Disco's "High Hopes", Selena Gomez's "Fetish" featuring Gucci Mane, Fifth Harmony's "Sledgehammer", Nicki Minaj's "The Boys", Chris Brown's "Remember My Name", Demi Lovato's "Made in the USA", Jason Derulo's "Marry Me", The Pussycat Dolls' "I Hate This Part" and Jordin Sparks' "One Step at a Time".

Production discography

References

External links
 
Jonas Jeberg on Myspace
 

Danish record producers
Danish songwriters
Danish expatriates in the United States
Living people
1975 births
People from Bornholm